G Fatt (born Myat Thu on 31 December 1992) is a Burmese singer, songwriter, rapper and actor. He is considered one of the most commercially successful Burmese singers. G Fatt released his debut album Gin on 21 February 2016 which became the best-selling album of the year.

Early life and education
G Fatt was born on 31 December 1992 in Yangon, Myanmar to parent Nyo Oo and his wife Myint Myint Wai. He is the youngest son of two siblings, having an elder sister. He attended high school at Basic Education High School No. 2 Thingangyun. He is currently studying in Myanmar major at the Dagon University.

Music career

G Fatt started out on his music career in the underground outfit and released underground hip-hop songs since before he got his big break. He first participated in group album "Amone Kabar Mha Nae Swel Myar" (The dates from hate world). He gained recognition in music industry with his songs "8 Day, 8 Month, 8 Hour" and "Pyi Pa Thoe Pay Sar" (A letter to my love abroad). The songs became widely popular and major hits in Myanmar since the day he released it on online. Since then, he gained the first recognition from his fans and participated in many group albums, stage performances, and many concerts at various locations throughout Myanmar.

In 2016, G Fatt started working with Frenzo Production, a major music production company in Myanmar and owned by Sai Sai Kham Leng. Since them, he started entertaining in Sai Sai Kham Leng's birthday show every year. G Fatt started endeavoring to be able to produce and distribute a solo album. He launched his debut solo album "Gin" on 21 February 2016 which turned out to be a success creating him a place to stand in Myanmar music industry. His second solo album "120/B" was released on 2 March 2018.

On 1 April 2019, Frenzo released an animation music video for "Nga Yee Zar Ka Po Mite Tal" (My girlfriend is better than yours) collaborating with Frenzo artists G Fatt, Sai Sai Kham Leng, Nay Win, Phyo Lay, Bunny Phyoe, Ki Ki Kyaw Zaw and John, which is one of the tracks in Sai Sai Kham Leng's album "Sai Sai is Sai Sai", was released on 1 April 2018. The music video became widely popular since the day released it on Sai Sai Kham Leng's official Facebook page and YouTube channel, and was praised for the animation quality and music video created by Pencell Studio. That music video was earned 1 M views within 24 hours and then 2 M views in 7 days.

One Man Shows

On 11 November 2018, G Fatt performed his first one-man show concert in the open area of Myaw Sin Island, Kandawgyi. Even with drizzling rain at the start of the concert, a huge crowd of loyal fans were celebrate enjoy the show in the rain.

On 13 January 2021, he hosted his third one-man show named Illusion Paradise via online and TV.

Acting career
G Fatt made his acting debut in the Burmese hip hop life film Ko Tha Mine Ko Yay Kya Thu Myar 2, where he played the main role with local hip hop artists include Yone Lay, Ya Tha, Kyat Pha, J Fire, Pyone Mya Thwe, Su Nandar Aung and others. The film is directed by Joe and which premiered in Myanmar cinemas on 12 January 2018.

Political activities
Following the 2021 Myanmar coup d'état, G Fatt was active in the anti-coup movement both in person at rallies and through social media. Denouncing the military coup, he has taken part in protests since February. He joined the "We Want Justice" three-finger salute movement. The movement was launched on social media, and many celebrities have joined the movement.

On 3 April 2021, warrants for his arrest were issued under section 505 (a) of the penal code by the State Administration Council for speaking out against the military coup. Along with several other celebrities, he was charged with calling for participation in the Civil Disobedience Movement (CDM) and damaging the state's ability to govern, with supporting the Committee Representing Pyidaungsu Hluttaw, and with generally inciting the people to disturb the peace and stability of the nation.

Partnerships
G Fatt is appointed as Samsung's brand ambassador for Myanmar in 2022.

Filmography

Film (Cinema)
 Ko Tha Mine Ko Yay Kya Thu Myar 2 (ကိုယ့်သမိုင်းကိုယ်ရေးကြသူများ ၂) (2018)

Discography

Solo albums 
 Gin (2016)
 120/B (2018)

Awards
 The Most Requested Song Award 2017, with Gin album, awarded by City FM

Other awards
1st Major M Music Awards (2018)

References

External links

1992 births
21st-century Burmese male actors
21st-century Burmese male singers
Burmese singer-songwriters
People from Yangon
Living people